Peter Wing Ho Chin, CNZM  (born 1941) is a lawyer and was the 56th Mayor of Dunedin, New Zealand. He served two terms as Mayor from 2004 to 2010.

Chin is a descendant of the earliest Chinese immigrants to New Zealand, and his family owned a take-away establishment in Stuart Street.

Early life and career
In the 1950s Chin was a student at Otago Boys' High School and then the University of Otago, graduating LLB. He has worked in Dunedin as a lawyer since 1968, and is currently a consultant for the Otago law firm Webb Farry. First elected in 1995 to the Dunedin City Council, representing the Hills Ward, he served three terms before becoming mayor in 2004, replacing Sukhi Turner who was retiring as mayor. He was re-elected in October 2007 with an absolute majority.

Chin serves as the head of the Gambling Commission, the government-appointed panel that regulates casinos. In the 2003 New Year Honours, he was appointed a Companion of the New Zealand Order of Merit, for services to local-body and community affairs.

He is the chair of the national Chinese Poll Tax Heritage Trust, which was set up with government funding in 2004. The trust aims to raise awareness of the early Chinese community in New Zealand and its history, language and culture.

Filmography
Chin played a minor part in the 1987 film Illustrious Energy, a historic drama based on the experiences of Chinese gold miners in Central Otago.

Controversy
Chin is a strong supporter of the controversial Forsyth Barr Stadium, over which questions have been raised over the cost and source of funding. This support almost certainly cost him the election. In the course of examining funding options he sent a confidential letter to the Government asking for money without full Council approval, and was on a committee of three that later censured Councillor Teresa Stevenson for leaking the letter to the Otago Daily Times. Chin chaired the Chinese Gardens Trust which built the Dunedin Chinese Garden, using $3.75 million of New Zealand taxpayers' and $1 million of Dunedin ratepayers' money. The Gardens were constructed in an authentic manner, using almost a thousand tonnes of rocks imported from Lake Tai, China.

Post-mayoral career
During the 2010 Dunedin mayoral election, Peter Chin was defeated by Greater Dunedin candidate and Dunedin City Council councillor Dave Cull. He was one of the twelve members of the Constitutional Advisory Panel, which sought public input on a written constitution for New Zealand, since 2011.

Personal life
Chin has been married to Noleen since 1964 with whom he had 4 children. he lives in Roslyn and is a prominent operatic singer. Chin suffered a heart attack on New Year's eve, 2014 whilst on a plane from Dunedin to Wellington to visit his son. He had a triple bypass and later recovered.

References

External links
 Profile and contact information at the Dunedin City Council
 Biography at Webb Farry Barristers & Solicitors

1941 births
Companions of the New Zealand Order of Merit
Living people
Mayors of Dunedin
Lawyers from Dunedin
New Zealand people of Chinese descent
University of Otago alumni